Group A of the 2015 Fed Cup Europe/Africa Zone Group II was one of two pools in the Europe/Africa zone of the 2015 Fed Cup. Four teams competed in a round-robin competition, with the top team and the bottom team proceeding to their respective sections of the play-offs: the top team played for advancement to Group I, while the bottom team faced potential relegation to Group III.

Standings

Round-robin

South Africa vs. Egypt

Estonia vs. Bosnia and Herzegovina

Estonia vs. South Africa

Bosnia and Herzegovina vs. Egypt

South Africa vs. Bosnia and Herzegovina

Estonia vs. Egypt

References

External links 
 Fed Cup website

A2